Anolis immaculogularis is a species of anole lizard first found in the Mexican states of Oaxaca, Guerrero, and Puebla. The species has keeled ventral scales.

References

External links
Reptile Database

Anoles
Lizards of North America
Endemic reptiles of Mexico
Natural history of Oaxaca
Natural history of Guerrero
Natural history of Puebla
Reptiles described in 2014
Taxa named by Gunther Köhler